Rohām is an Iranian hero, described in the Iranian epic poem Shahnameh. Roham is son of Goudarz, grandson of Keshvad and the father of Farhad. He fought in the Keykhosrow wars and in wars to avenge his father's defeat.

Family tree

Meaning

 In Persian language: roham

 In Avestan: Majestic Wine.

Persian mythology
Shahnameh characters